Lake View is an unincorporated community in Posey Township, Franklin County, Indiana.

Geography

References

Unincorporated communities in Franklin County, Indiana
Unincorporated communities in Indiana